Bono da Ferrara or Bono Ferrarese (active 1441–1461) was an Italian painter of the early-Renaissance period.

Biography
He seems to have been the pupil of both Pisano and Squarcione. He was employed by the Dukes of Ferrara to decorate their castles at Migliaro and Belfiore, in 1450 and 1452. He also painted a St. Christopher in the chapel of the Eremitani at Padua, and he is said to have assisted in the decorations of the Cathedral of Siena in 1461. The National Gallery possesses a St. Jerome in the Desert, by him, and in the Galleries of Dresden and Munich are also paintings assigned to this artist. His style partakes of that of his master Squarcione, and also of that of his fellow-pupil Mantegna. Of his birth or death no dates can be given.

References

Attribution:

External links

Year of birth unknown
Year of death unknown
15th-century Italian painters
Quattrocento painters
Italian male painters
Painters from Ferrara
1441 births